The House at 92 Willard Street in Quincy, Massachusetts, is, somewhat oddly, believed to be the only granite house ever built in the city, which is well known for its granite quarries.  The house is located in West Quincy, near its famous granite quarries, and was built in the 1830s.  It is a -story structure, fashioned out of granite blocks, with a gable roof.  A single-story hip-roofed porch once wrapped around two sides; it was an early 20th-century addition that has since been removed.  The main facade is three bays wide, with the entrance at the center.

The house was listed on the National Register of Historic Places in 1989.

Gallery

See also
National Register of Historic Places listings in Quincy, Massachusetts

References

Federal architecture in Massachusetts
Houses completed in 1830
Houses in Quincy, Massachusetts
National Register of Historic Places in Quincy, Massachusetts
1830 establishments in Massachusetts
Houses on the National Register of Historic Places in Norfolk County, Massachusetts